愛自己 Love Yourself is the first mandopop album and twelfth overall studio album by the Hong Kong pop singer Prudence Liew, released on May 1, 2000, in Taiwan.

Album information
After a six-year break from the Hong Kong music industry, Liew signed a record deal with the Taiwanese record label Rock Records through her friend and colleague, Sandy Lam. Production of this began in 1999. It was recorded in Vancouver, Singapore and Taipei and produced by Lam's then-husband, Jonathan Lee.

Only one single was released from this album, "Everytime, I Take It Very Seriously". A music video was produced to accompany the track. Soon after the release of the single and album, Liew returned to San Francisco, where she resided at the time. Her next major comeback was eight years later, with her concert series, Opening the Sexual Boundaries.

Track listing
 Tell You My Story
 每次我都很認真 (Everytime, I Take It Very Seriously)
 因為我沒有 (Because I Have Not)
 傷人太重 (Hurting Someone Too Severely)
 The Last Night
 讓步 (Give Way)
 偷想 (Secretly Thinking)
 旅行 (Vacation)
 關燈 (Turn Off The Light)
 好好過下去 (Live Well From This Point Forward)

References

2000 albums
Prudence Liew albums
Mandopop albums
Rock Records albums